Yvonne Jones Brewster  (née Clarke; born 7 October 1938) is a Jamaican actress, theatre director and businesswoman, known for her role as Ruth Harding in the BBC television soap opera Doctors. She co-founded the theatre companies Talawa in the UK and The Barn in Jamaica.

Biography
Born in Kingston, Jamaica, Yvonne Brewster recalls being inspired to become an actress at the age of 16, when her father took her to the Ward Theatre "to see a French play, called Huis Clos, written by Jean Paul Sartre. And in it was Mona Chin, who I thought looked just like me. She was fantastic. I looked at this woman and I said, 'Hey, Daddy, I want to be like her. In 1956, Brewster went to the UK to study drama at Rose Bruford College – where she was the UK's first Black woman drama student, being told on her first day that she was unlikely to find theatrical work in Britain – and also attended the Royal Academy of Music, receiving a distinction in Drama and Mime. She returned to Jamaica to teach Drama and in 1965 she also jointly founded (with Trevor Rhone) The Barn in Kingston, Jamaica's first professional theatre company.

Upon her return to England in the early 1970s, she worked extensively in radio, television, and directing for stage productions. Between 1982 and 1984, she was Drama Officer at the Arts Council of Great Britain. In 1985 she co-founded Talawa Theatre Company with Mona Hammond, Carmen Munroe and Inigo Espejel, using funding from the Greater London Council (then led by Ken Livingstone). Brewster was Talawa's artistic director until 2003, directing a production of C. L. R. James's play The Black Jacobins in 1986 at the Riverside Studios as the first play to be staged by the black-led company, with Norman Beaton in the principal role of Toussaint L'Ouverture. Another landmark came in 1991 when she directed the first all-black production of William Shakespeare`s Antony and Cleopatra, starring Doña Croll and Jeffery Kissoon.

Brewster is a patron of the Clive Barker Centre for Theatrical Innovation.

Personal life 
She married after returning to England from Jamaica in 1971, and she and her husband now live in Florence.

Awards and recognition
In the 1993 New Year Honours, Brewster was appointed an Officer of the Order of the British Empire (OBE). In 2001 she was granted an honorary doctorate from the Open University. She received a living legend award from the National Black Theatre Festival in 2001. 

She featured on the 2003 list of 100 Great Black Britons. In 2005, the University of London's Central School of Speech and Drama conferred an honorary fellowship on Brewster in acknowledgment of her involvement in the development of British theatre. In 2013 she was named one of BBC's 100 Women.

Publications
In 2004, Brewster published her memoirs, entitled The Undertaker’s Daughter: The Colourful Life of a Theatre Director (Arcadia Books).  She has also edited five collections of plays, including Barry Reckord's For the Reckord (Oberon Books, 2010) and Mixed Company: Three Early Jamaican Plays, published by Oberon Books in 2012. In 2018 she published Vaulting Ambition: Jamaica's Barn Theatre 1966–2005.

Selected bibliography
 The Undertaker’s Daughter: The Colourful Life of a Theatre Director (BlackAmber/Arcadia Books, 2004)
 Vaulting Ambition: Jamaica’s Barn Theatre 1965–2005 (Peepal Tree Press, 2017)

Further reading
 Rodreguez King-Dorset, Black British Theatre Pioneers: Yvonne Brewster and the First Generation of Actors, Playwrights and Other Practitioners, McFarland & Co, 2014, .

References

External links
  

1938 births
Alumni of Rose Bruford College
Alumni of the Royal Academy of Music
BBC 100 Women
Black British actresses
Black British women writers
British soap opera actresses
Drama teachers
Jamaican emigrants to the United Kingdom
Jamaican theatre directors
Jamaican women writers
Living people
Officers of the Order of the British Empire
People associated with the Open University
People from Kingston, Jamaica
Women theatre directors